Ro-57 may refer to:

 IMAM Ro.57, an Italian fighter aircraft of 1939
 , an Imperial Japanese Navy submarine in commission from 1922 to 1945
 Ro-57-class submarine, an alternative name for the Type L3 subclass of the Japanese Type L submarine